Mishawaka  is a city on the St. Joseph River, in Penn Township, St. Joseph County, in the U.S. state of Indiana. The population was 51,063 as of the 2020 census. Its nickname is "the Princess City". Mishawaka is a principal city of the South Bend–Mishawaka, IN-MI, Metropolitan Statistical Area.

History

Mishawaka's recorded history began with the discovery of bog iron deposits at the beginning of the 1830s. Settlers arriving to mine the deposits founded the town of St. Joseph Iron Works in 1831. Within a few years, the town had a blast furnace, a general store, a tavern, and about 200 residents. Business prospered, and in 1833 St. Joseph Iron Works, Indiana City, and two other adjacent small towns were incorporated to form the city of Mishawaka.

The Mishawaka post office has been in operation since 1833.

In September 1872, a fire destroyed three quarters of Mishawaka's business district. However, the citizens rebuilt and attracted new industry. The Dodge Manufacturing Company, Perkins Windmills and the Mishawaka Woolen and Rubber Company (later Ball Band, then Uniroyal) all helped the town to prosper. Mishawaka grew through both industry and agriculture. In the late 19th century, Mishawaka became known as the "Peppermint Capital of the World", since the area's rich black loam produced great quantities of mint.

From 1906 to 1915, Mishawaka was the manufacturing home of the luxurious American Simplex motor car. Ball Band made rubber garments and was hit by a major strike in 1931. It flourished in the 1940s, finally closing in 1997 in the face of cheaper imports. Manufacturing in Mishawaka peaked in the 1940s and began a slow decline due to industrial restructuring. The economic base shifted to retail services and small industry.

In 1979, University Park Mall opened in the far northern portion of Mishawaka. In 1990, AM General began producing the Hummer in its Mishawaka plant. The MV-1 is a purpose-built taxicab and replaces the planned Standard Taxi; it was developed in collaboration with AM General. The car is built in Mishawaka at an AM General plant. AM General will begin making Mercedes vehicles at this plant in 2015.

Awards
 A Business Week Magazine Best Place to Raise Your Kids 2010: Indiana

Neighborhoods, leisure and sports heritage
Old-fashioned neighborhoods are found across the city. Many of the newer residential subdivisions that have been developed within the city in recent years have adopted design guidelines to produce the "hometown" neighborhood feel and encourage community spirit.

The city continually upgrades and develops new neighborhood park and recreation facilities. A total of 29 parks allow Mishawaka residents to golf, play ball, fish and exercise. In 1968, the city opened an outdoor Olympic-size swimming pool and an adjacent ice skating rink at Merrifield Park. On the south side, Mishawaka's George Wilson Park is home to the city's most popular winter toboggan spot, as well as an 18-hole frisbee golf course. Some of the city's Italian immigrants and their descendants still play traditional games such as bocce, and a few ethnic Belgians continue to raise and race homing pigeons. The city also hosted the nation's oldest and largest wiffleball tournament, the World Wiffle Ball Championship, from 1980 to 2012 and again in 2020.

The city's three high schools (Mishawaka High School, Penn High School, and Marian High School) have won a combined 11 state championships in football since 1920.

International Sister cities
 Soest, Germany
 Shiojiri, Japan

Points of interest

 Beutter Park - The new park includes a river race with elliptical-shaped overlook weirs and fiber-optic underwater lighting, two connecting bridges across the St. Joseph River race to the park, the Mishawaka Riverwalk, the "Shards" sculpture, and an 800-foot perennial garden.
 Battell Park Historic District, has a WPA-built band shelter and terraced rock garden.
 Old Mishawaka Carnegie Library on N. Hill St - closed as a library in 1969 and is now a restaurant.
 Shiojiri Garden, located in Merrifield Park, is a Japanese strolling garden that symbolizes the Sister-City relationship between Mishawaka and Shiojiri City, Japan.
 The Beiger Mansion, built in 1903 and restored in 1973, was gutted by arson in 1974. The building has since been renovated. It is operated as a bed-and-breakfast and events facility.
The Otis R. Bowen Museum, located on the campus of Bethel College, houses memorabilia and artifacts related to Dr. Otis Bowen's years as Governor of Indiana and Secretary of Health and Human Services. It has a copy of the Otis Bowen bust.
 In addition to the Battell Park Historic District, Beiger Mansion, and Old Mishawaka Carnegie Library, the Dodge House, Eller-Hosford House, Ellis-Schindler House, Kamm and Schellinger Brewery, Merrifield-Cass House, and Normain Heights Historic District are listed on the National Register of Historic Places.  The Tivoli Theater, demolished in 2005, was formerly listed.

Notable people

 Sarah Evans Barker, judge
 Remo Belli, Creator of Remo Drum Heads
 Kyle Bornheimer, actor
 John Brademas, politician 
 Conte Candoli, jazz musician (played trumpet in Doc Severinsen's The Tonight Show Band)
 Pete Candoli, jazz musician (played trumpet in Woody Herman's Big Band)
 Adam Driver, actor 
 Norman Eddy, Indiana Secretary of State
 Tom Ehlers, NFL football player
 Buddy Emmons, pedal steel guitarist
 Freddie Fitzsimmons, Major League Baseball pitcher and manager
 Todd A. Fonseca, author
 Daniel L. Gard, Navy chaplain
 Lisa Germano, musician 
 Ben Goldwasser, keyboardist
 Kevin Gosztola, journalist, writer, documentarian
 George Gulyanics, professional football player (Chicago Bears)
 Charles Kuhl, World War II soldier, famous for being slapped by General Patton, which led to Patton losing his command
 Allan Lane, actor 
 Chick Maggioli, professional football player
 Ruth McKenney, author 
 William J. Oliver, contractor
 Anna Rohrer, long distance runner
 Mike Rosenthal, NFL offensive lineman
 Irene Vernon, actress
 Sharon Versyp, Purdue women's basketball coach
 Joy Lynn White, country western musician

Geography

Demographics

As of 2000 the median income for a household in the city was $33,986, and the median income for a family was $41,947. Males had a median income of $33,878 versus $23,672 for females. The per capita income for the city was $18,434. About 7.3% of families and 9.9% of the population were below the poverty line, including 11.7% of those under age 18 and 7.3% of those age 65 or over.

2010 census
As of the census of 2010, there were 48,252 people, 21,343 households, and 11,730 families residing in the city. The racial makeup of the city was 86.1% White, 6.9% African American, 0.4% Native American, 1.9% Asian, 0.1% Pacific Islander, 1.6% from other races, and 2.9% from two or more races. Hispanic or Latino of any race were 4.5% of the population.

There were 21,343 households, of which 28.2% had children under the age of 18 living with them, 35.5% were married couples living together, 14.4% had a female householder with no husband present, 5.1% had a male householder with no wife present, and 45.0% were non-families. 37.4% of all households were made up of individuals, and 12.4% had someone living alone who was 65 years of age or older. The average household size was 2.21 and the average family size was 2.92.

The median age in the city was 34.7 years. 23.1% of residents were under the age of 18; 11.4% were between the ages of 18 and 24; 28.3% were from 25 to 44; 23.7% were from 45 to 64; and 13.6% were 65 years of age or older. The gender makeup of the city was 47.1% male and 52.9% female.

Transportation
Mishawaka is served by TRANSPO municipal bus system, which also serves South Bend and several smaller suburbs in South Bend-Mishawaka metropolitan region. The Interurban Trolley's Bittersweet/Mishawaka route stops at Martin's Supermarket, connecting riders to the city of Elkhart and the town of Osceola. The closest Amtrak station and the closest commercial airport are both located in western South Bend.

Major highways
 Indiana Toll Road, which is Interstate 80 and Interstate 90. 
 U.S. Route 20
 Indiana State Road 23
 Indiana State Road 331
 Indiana State Road 933

Education

Public schools

Public schools in Mishawaka and/or serving Mishawaka are operated by several school districts. School City of Mishawaka serves the central part of the city. Other sections are within the Penn-Harris-Madison School Corporation and the South Bend Community School Corporation. Mishawaka High School is the sole high school of the Mishawaka school district.

Penn-Harris elementary schools serving sections of Mishawaka include Walt Disney (in the Mishawaka city limits), Elm Road, Meadow's Edge, Prairie Vista, and Elsie Rogers; the middle schools respectively are Schmucker and Grissom. Penn High School, outside of the city limits, is the sole public high school of the Penn-Harris-Madison school district. Aside from Walt Disney Elementary, none of the other respective schools are in the Mishawaka city limits. The school zonings for the South Bend School Corporation area are as follows (none of the schools are in Mishawaka): Darden Elementary School Edison Middle School and Adams High School. The section was in 2020 zoned to Tarkington Elementary, which closed in 2021.

Private and tertiary education, and libraries
The Roman Catholic Diocese of Fort Wayne-South Bend operates four private Catholic schools in Mishawaka, including Marian High School.

Bethel University is an accredited evangelical Christian liberal arts school with 1,700 students.

Mishawaka has a public library, a branch of the Mishawaka-Penn-Harris Public Library system.

Media
One major daily newspaper serving the South Bend and Mishawaka metro area, the South Bend Tribune. It is distributed in north central Indiana and southwestern Michigan.

Mishawaka has a wide variety of local radio broadcast available in the area. Stations' programming content contains a wide variety including public radio, classical music, religious, country, and urban contemporary among others. For more information, see List of Radio Stations in Mishawaka, Indiana.

As of 2013, the South Bend-Mishawaka-Elkhart designated market area was the 95th largest in the United States, with 319,860 (0.3% of the US population)
homes. Most of the major television networks have affiliates in the Michiana area.

Mishawaka located stations include WSBT-TV (CBS), WBND-LD (ABC), WCWW-LD (CW) and WMYS-LD (My Network TV).
Stations located in nearby South Bend, IN include WNDU-TV (NBC), WNIT-TV (PBS) and WHME-TV (LeSEA).

Legend of "Princess" Mishawaka
One legend holds that the city is named after Mishawaka, daughter of Shawnee Chief Elkhart. Although Native Americans do not have royalties, in the 19th century, "princess" was a term often used to describe a tribal Chief's daughter. According to the story, the Shawnee were permitted to settle on Potawatomi lands in the late 18th century, and Potawatomi Chief Grey Wolf soon fell in love with Mishawaka. She rejected his advances and pledged her love to a white trapper, known only as Deadshot. A war between the two tribes ensued, and Grey Wolf captured Mishawaka and threatened to kill her unless she married him. Deadshot followed him, however, and the two men fought to the death.  Grey Wolf died, but not before stabbing Mishawaka in the breast. She recovered, but died in 1818 at age 32. She was supposedly buried near Lincoln Park, where a bronze marker recounts the legend.

References

Further reading
 Babcock, Glenn D. History of United States Rubber Company: A Case Study in Corporate Management (1966).
 Baker, Ward. "Mishawaka on the Eve of Conflict" Indiana Magazine of History (1959) 55#1  pp. 25–46 in JSTOR in 1860; online
 Baker, Ward. "Mishawaka and its Volunteers, Fort Sumter through 1861." Indiana Magazine of History (1960): 123-152. online

 Bridges, Janice. Indiana's princess city: The history of Mishawaka, 1832-1932 (1976)
 DeKever, Peter J. With Our Past: Essays on the history of Mishawaka (2003)
 Eisen, D., ed. A Mishawaka Mosaic (Mishawaka: Friends of the Mishawaka Library, 1983), on diverse ethnic groups

 Fotia, Elizabeth R., and Karen Rasmussen. "The Italian-Americans of the South Bend-Mishawaka Area." (ERIC, 1975)  online

 Hume, Susan E. "Belgian Settlement and Society in the Indiana Rust Belt," Geographical Review (2003) 93#1 pp. 30–50 in JSTOR on the Flemish settlement in southwest Mishawaka that begin in 1920s
  deals mostly with Mishawaka.

External links

City of Mishawaka, Indiana website
St. Joseph County Chamber of Commerce

 
Cities in Indiana
Populated places established in 1833
Cities in St. Joseph County, Indiana
South Bend – Mishawaka metropolitan area
1833 establishments in Indiana